Shelgaon, commonly known as "Shelgaon Maratha", or "Shelgaon Mahavishnu" is a village located in Sonpeth taluka of Parbhani district, in state of Maharashtra.

Demographics
As per 2011 census:
Shelgaon Maratha has 670 families residing. The village has population of 3282.
Out of the population of 3282, 1676 are males while 1606 are females.
Literacy rate of the village is 62.50%.
Average sex ratio of Shelgaon village is 958 females to 1000 males. Average sex ratio of Maharashtra state is 929.

Geography, and transport

References

Villages in Parbhani district